Outpatient parenteral antibiotic therapy (OPAT) is used to administer non-oral antibiotics (usually intravenously) without a need for ongoing hospitalisation. OPAT is particularly useful in people who are not severely unwell but do require a prolonged course of treatment that cannot be given in oral form.
OPAT is being increasingly adopted as part of antimicrobial stewardship programs, it can reduce length of stay, costs and adverse events while improving quality of life. OPAT can be administered in Day Hospital or as part of home assistance care using elastomeric pumps.

Common antimicrobials
Common antimicrobials used for continuous infusion are shown below:

Before starting beta-lactams and vancomycin infusion, it is advisable to administer a loading dose in order to reduce time to reach target concentrations

References

Medical treatments